The Archdiocese of New York is an ecclesiastical territory or archdiocese of the Catholic Church (particularly the Roman Catholic or Latin Church) located in the State of New York. It encompasses the boroughs of Manhattan, the Bronx and Staten Island in New York City and the counties of Dutchess, Orange, Putnam, Rockland, Sullivan, Ulster, and Westchester. The Archdiocese of New York is the second-largest diocese in the United States by population, encompassing 296 parishes that serve around 2.8 million Catholics, in addition to hundreds of Catholic schools, hospitals and charities. The archdiocese also operates the well-known St. Joseph's Seminary, commonly referred to as Dunwoodie. The Archdiocese of New York is the metropolitan see of the ecclesiastical province of New York which includes the suffragan dioceses of Albany, Brooklyn, Buffalo, Ogdensburg, Rochester, Rockville Centre and Syracuse.

It publishes a bi-weekly newspaper, Catholic New York, the largest of its kind in the United States.

Prelature 
The ordinary of the Archdiocese of New York is an archbishop whose cathedra is the Cathedral of St. Patrick (commonly St. Patrick's Cathedral) in Manhattan, New York. The Archbishop of New York is also the metropolitan of the larger Ecclesiastical Province of New York, which consists of the eight dioceses that comprise the State of New York with the exception of a small portion (Fishers Island) that belongs to the Province of Hartford. As such, the metropolitan archbishop possesses certain limited authority over the suffragan sees of the province (see ecclesiastical province).

R. Luke Concanen became the first Bishop of the (then) Diocese of New York in 1808. The current archbishop of New York is Timothy Michael Cardinal Dolan.

History
On November 26, 1784, Pope Pius VI erected the Apostolic Prefecture of United States of America with the territory of what was then the entire United States of America. On November 6, 1789, the same pope raised this prefecture to a diocese and changed its title to Diocese of Baltimore headed by the first American bishop, John Carroll.

At the time, there was a dearth of priests to minister to the large territory. The first Catholic Church in New York City was St. Peter's Church on Barclay Street. The land was purchased from Trinity Church with community donations and a gift of 1,000 pieces of silver from King Charles III of Spain. The church was built in the federal style. Among its regular worshippers were Elizabeth Ann Seton and Pierre Toussaint.

On April 8, 1808, Pope Pius VII erected the Diocese of Philadelphia, the Diocese of Boston, the Diocese of Bardstown, and the Diocese of New York, taking their territory from the Diocese of Baltimore. He simultaneously elevated the Diocese of Baltimore to a metropolitan archdiocese and assigned all four new sees as its suffragans. The initial territory of the Diocese of New York encompassed all of the State of New York and Sussex, Bergen, Morris, Essex, Somerset, Middlesex, and Monmouth counties in northeastern New Jersey.

The first appointed Bishop of New York could not set sail from Italy due to the Napoleonic blockade, so a Jesuit priest, Anthony Kohlmann, was chosen as administrator pending his arrival. He was instrumental in organizing the diocese and preparing for its original Cathedral of St. Patrick to be built on Mulberry Street. The difficulties faced by Catholics at the time included anti-Catholic bigotry in general and in the New York school system and a strong Nativist movement that sought to keep Catholics out of the country and to prevent those already present from advancing.

On April 23, 1847, Pope Pius IX erected the Diocese of Albany and Diocese of Buffalo, taking their initial territory from the Diocese of New York.

On July 19, 1850, the same pope elevated the Diocese of New York to an archdiocese.

On July 29, 1853, the same pope erected the Diocese of Newark, with territory taken from the Diocese of New York and the Diocese of Philadelphia, and the Diocese of Brooklyn, with territory taken from the Diocese of New York.

On February 16, 1872, the Diocese of Ogdensburg was established.

On July 25, 1885, the same pope annexed the territory of The Bahamas to the Archdiocese of New York, establishing their first permanent Catholic presence, due to their proximity to New York's busy port. The Archdiocese of New York constructed and administered churches and schools in the Bahamas until Pope Pius XI erected the Apostolic Prefecture of Bahama on March 21, 1929, enabled a transition. By 1932, The Bahamas were no longer under the spiritual jurisdiction of New York. This established the present territory of the Archdiocese of New York.

From 1919 to 1983, the Archbishops of New York held the collateral position of Apostolic Vicar of the Military Vicariate of the United States. Pope John Paul II terminated this arrangement, first by appointing Bishop John Joseph O'Connor as Archbishop of New York but as Apostolic Administrator of the Military Vicariate of the United States on 26 January 1984 to oversee the transition and, subsequently, by reconstituting the Military Vicariate of the United States as the present Archdiocese for the Military Services, USA, with its own archbishop and its see relocated to Washington, DC on 21 July 1986.

In 2008, the Archdiocese of New York celebrated its bicentennial anniversary of its establishment as a diocese. To mark the occasion, Pope Benedict XVI visited the archdiocese from April 18 to April 20. During his visit, Benedict visited St. Patrick's Cathedral, The United Nations, Ground Zero, St. Joseph's Parish in Yorkville, St. Joseph's Seminary in Yonkers and celebrated a Mass at Yankee Stadium in The Bronx.

In 2009, Timothy Dolan was named the 10th Archbishop of New York. He was made a Cardinal in February 2012.

Since the start of the 21st century, The Archdiocese of New York, like other dioceses around the country and the world, has been dealing with a decline in priestly vocations. This has led to a number of parishes being closed and/or merged, and in some cases priests are being asked to take care of multiple parishes at once.

Archdiocesan demographics

As of 2023, the Catholic population of the archdiocese was 2,642,740. These Catholics were served by 320 archdiocesan priests, 195 priests of religious orders, and 140 international priests. Also laboring in the diocese were 228 permanent deacons, and 443 men and women religious.

As of 2023, the archdiocese currently has around 60 men enrolled in its priestly formation program.

For comparison, in 1929, the Catholic population of the archdiocese was 1,273,291 persons. There were 1,314 clergy ministering in the archdiocese and 444 churches. There were also 170,348 children in Catholic educational and welfare institutions.

Anniversaries of significance to the archdiocese
January 4 – Memorial of Saint Elizabeth Ann Seton, native of New York
January 5 – Memorial of Saint John Neumann, ordained a priest of New York
March 17 – Solemnity of Saint Patrick, Patronal Feast of both the archdiocese and the cathedral
April 8 – Anniversary of the establishment of the Diocese of New York (1808)
July 14 – Memorial of Saint Kateri Tekakwitha, born near Albany in territory which was once part of the Diocese of New York
September 5 – Memorial of Saint Teresa of Calcutta, who did missionary work in the Bronx
October 5 – Anniversary of Dedication of the current Cathedral of Saint Patrick (1910)
November 13 – Memorial of Saint Frances Xavier Cabrini, missionary in New York

Leadership

Below is a list of individuals who have led the Archdiocese of New York and its antecedent jurisdictions since its founding.

Bishops of New York
 R. Luke Concanen (1808–1810)
 John Connolly (1814–1825)
 John Dubois (1826–1842)
 John Hughes (1842–1850; coadjutor bishop 1837–1842), elevated to archbishop  - John McCloskey (coadjutor 1843–1847), appointed Bishop of Albany; subsequently returned as archbishop in 1864

Archbishops of New York
 John Hughes (1850–1864)
 John McCloskey (1864–1885) (Cardinal in 1875)
 Michael Corrigan (1885–1902; coadjutor archbishop 1880–1885)
 John Farley (1902–1918)
 Patrick Hayes (1919–1938)
 Francis Spellman (1939–1967)  - James Francis McIntyre (coadjutor 1946–1948), appointed Archbishop of Los Angeles  - John Joseph Maguire (coadjutor 1965–1980), did not have right of succession
 Terence Cooke (1968–1983)
 John O'Connor (1984–2000)
 Edward Egan (2000–2009)
 Timothy Dolan (2009–present)

Current auxiliary bishops of New York
Peter John Byrne (2014–present)
Edmund James Whalen (2019–present)
Gerardo Joseph Colacicco (2019–present)
John S. Bonnici (2022–present) 
Joseph A. Espaillat (2022–present)

Former auxiliary bishops of New York
John Farley (1895–1902), appointed archbishop of this archdiocese
Thomas Cusack (1904–1915), appointed Bishop of Albany
Patrick Hayes (1914–1919), appointed archbishop of this archdiocese
John Joseph Dunn (1921–1933)
Stephen Joseph Donahue (1934–1972)
James Francis McIntyre (1941–1946), appointed coadjutor archbishop of this archdiocese, then Archbishop of Los Angeles (Cardinal in 1953)
Joseph Patrick Donahue (1945–1959)
Thomas John McDonnell (1947–1951), appointed Coadjutor Bishop of Wheeling
Joseph Francis Flannelly (1948–1969)
James Henry Ambrose Griffiths (1950–1964)
Fulton J. Sheen (1951–1966), appointed Bishop of Rochester, then appointed Titular Archbishop
Walter P. Kellenberg (1953–1954), appointed Bishop of Ogdensburg, then Bishop of Rockville Centre
Edward Vincent Dargin (1953–1973)
Joseph Maria Pernicone (1954–1978)
John Michael Fearns (1957–1972)
John Joseph Maguire (1959–1965), appointed coadjutor archbishop of this archdiocese
Edward Ernest Swanstrom (1960–1978)
James Edward McManus (1963–1970), previously Bishop of Ponce, Puerto Rico
George Henry Guilfoyle (1964–1968), appointed Bishop of Camden
Terence Cooke (1965–1968), appointed archbishop of this archdiocese
John William Comber (1966–1976)
Edwin Broderick (1967–1969), appointed Bishop of Albany
Edward Dennis Head (1970–1973), appointed Bishop of Buffalo
Patrick Vincent Ahern (1970–1994)
James Patrick Mahoney (1972–1997)
Anthony Francis Mestice (1973–2001)
Theodore Edgar McCarrick (1977–1981), appointed the first Bishop of Metuchen, then Archbishop of Newark, then Archbishop of Washington (Cardinal 2001–2018)
Austin Bernard Vaughan (1977–2000)
Francisco Garmendia (1977–2001)
Joseph Thomas O'Keefe (1982–1987), appointed Bishop of Syracuse
Emerson John Moore (1982–1995)
Edward Egan (1985–1988), appointed Bishop of Bridgeport, then returned as archbishop of this archdiocese
William Jerome McCormack (1987–2001)
Patrick Sheridan (1990–2011)
Henry J. Mansell (1993–1995), appointed Bishop of Buffalo, then Archbishop of Hartford
Edwin Frederick O'Brien (1996–1997), appointed Archbishop for the Military Services, USA, then Archbishop of Baltimore, then Grand Master of the Order of the Holy Sepulchre (Cardinal in 2012)
Robert Anthony Brucato (1997–2006)
James Francis McCarthy (1999–2002)
Timothy A. McDonnell (2001–2004), appointed Bishop of Springfield in Massachusetts
Josu Iriondo (2001–2014)
Dominick John Lagonegro (2001–2018)
Dennis Joseph Sullivan (2004–2013), appointed Bishop of Camden
Gerald Thomas Walsh (2004–2017)
John Joseph Jenik (2014–2019)
John Joseph O'Hara (2014–2021)

Other priests of the diocese who became bishops
Benedict Joseph Fenwick, appointed Bishop of Boston (1825)
William Quarter, appointed the first Bishop of Chicago (1843)
Andrew Byrne, appointed the first Bishop of Little Rock (1844)
Bernard O'Reilly, appointed Bishop of Hartford (1850)
Saint John Neumann, appointed Bishop of Philadelphia (1852)
James Roosevelt Bayley, appointed the first bishop of Newark (1853), then Archbishop of Baltimore
John Loughlin, appointed the first Bishop of Brooklyn (1853)
David William Bacon, appointed the first bishop of Portland, Maine (1855)
Francis Patrick McFarland, appointed Vicar Apostolic of Florida (1857; did not take effect) and Bishop of Hartford (1858)
John J. Conroy, appointed Bishop of Albany (1865)
William George McCloskey, appointed Bishop of Louisville (1868)
Bernard John McQuaid, appointed the first Bishop of Rochester (1868)
Francis McNeirny, appointed Coadjutor Bishop of Albany (1871), then Bishop of Albany
William Hickley Gross, appointed Bishop of Savannah (1873), then Archbishop of Oregon City
John Lancaster Spalding, appointed the first bishop of Peoria (1876)
Michael J. O'Farrell, appointed the first Bishop of Trenton (1881)
Henry P. Northrop, appointed Vicar Apostolic of North Carolina (1881) and Bishop of Charleston
Charles Edward McDonnell, appointed Bishop of Brooklyn (1892)
Henry Gabriels, Rector of St Joseph's Seminary in Troy, New York, appointed Bishop of Ogdensburg, New York (1892)
Thomas O'Gorman, appointed Bishop of Sioux Falls (1896)
Charles H. Colton, appointed Bishop of Buffalo (1903)
Bonaventure Broderick, appointed Auxiliary Bishop of Havana (1903)
John T. McNicholas, appointed Bishop of Duluth (1918), then Archbishop of Cincinnati
Francis Joseph Tief, appointed Bishop of Concordia, Kansas (1920)
Daniel Joseph Curley, appointed Bishop of Syracuse (1923)
John Joseph Mitty, appointed Bishop of Salt Lake City (1926), then Coadjutor Archbishop of San Francisco, then Archbishop of San Francisco
Joseph Francis Rummel, appointed Bishop of Omaha (1928), then Archbishop of New Orleans
James E. Kearney, appointed Bishop of Salt Lake City (1932), then Bishop of Rochester
Bryan Joseph McEntegart, appointed Bishop of Ogdensburg (1943), later Bishop of Brooklyn (1957)
William Scully, appointed Coadjutor Bishop of Albany (1945), then Bishop of Albany
Patrick Aloysius O'Boyle, appointed Archbishop of Washington (1947) (Cardinal in 1967)
Christopher Joseph Weldon, appointed Bishop of Springfield in Massachusetts (1950)
Philip Joseph Furlong, appointed Auxiliary Bishop for the Military Services, USA (1956)
Francis Frederick Reh, appointed Bishop of Charleston (1962), then Rector of the Pontifical North American College, then Bishop of Saginaw
Thomas Andrew Donnellan, appointed Bishop of Ogdensburg (1964), then Archbishop of Atlanta
Charles Borromeo McLaughlin, appointed auxiliary bishop of Raleigh (1964), then the first bishop of St. Petersburg
Thomas C. Kelly, appointed auxiliary bishop of Washington (1977), then Archbishop of Louisville
Joseph Thomas Dimino, appointed auxiliary bishop for the Military Services, USA (1983), then Archbishop for the Military Services, USA
Roberto González Nieves, appointed auxiliary bishop of Boston (1988), Bishop of Corpus Christi, then Archbishop of San Juan
Rrok Kola Mirdita, appointed Archbishop of Tiranë-Durrës, Albania (1993)
Emilio S. Allué, appointed auxiliary bishop of Boston (1996)
Charles Daniel Balvo, appointed an apostolic nuncio and titular archbishop (2005)
Charles John Brown, appointed an apostolic nuncio and titular archbishop (2011)
William James Muhm, appointed auxiliary bishop for the Military Services, USA (2019)

Churches

Schools 

The headquarters of the archdiocesan school system is in the New York Catholic Center Terrence Cardinal Cooke Building in Midtown Manhattan.

Religious orders

Cemeteries
The following cemeteries are under the auspices of Calvary & Allied Cemeteries, Inc.:

Calvary Cemetery - Established in 1847; located in Queens. The cemetery, while located in the Diocese of Brooklyn, is property of the Archdiocese of New York as it was established before the Diocese of Brooklyn was canonically erected.
Cemetery of the Ascension - Located in Airmont in Rockland County.
Cemetery of the Resurrection - Located in Staten Island.
Gate of Heaven Cemetery - Located in Valhalla in Westchester County.
St. Ann Cemetery - Located in Kingston in Ulster County. Acquired by Calvary & Allied Cemeteries in 2021.
St. Mary Cemetery - Located in Rye Brook in Westchester County. Established in 1863 by Our Lady of Mercy Church in Port Chester; transferred to Calvary & Allied Cemeteries in 2018.

Many parishes have their own cemeteries, or their own sections in private cemeteries. An incomplete list of those cemeteries follows:

All Souls Cemetery (Pleasantville) - Belongs to Holy Innocents Church in Pleasantville.
Assumption Cemetery (Cortlandt Manor) - Belongs to Assumption Church in Peekskill.
Calvary Cemetery (Newburgh) - Belongs to St. Patrick Church in Newburgh.
Calvary Cemetery (Poughkeepsie) - Belongs to St. Martin de Porres Church in Poughkeepsie.
Holy Mount Cemetery (Eastchester) - Belongs to Immaculate Conception-Assumption Parish in Tuckahoe.
Holy Sepulchre Cemetery (New Rochelle) - Belongs to Blessed Sacrament Church in New Rochelle.
Mount Calvary Cemetery (White Plains) - Belongs to St. John the Evangelist Church in White Plains.
Sacred Heart Cemetery (Barrytown) - Belongs to St. Christopher Church in Red Hook. The parish has a mission chapel in Barrytown.
St. Anastasia Cemetery (Harriman) - Belongs to St. Anastasia Church in Harriman.
St. Denis Cemetery (Hopewell Junction) - Belongs to St. Denis Church in Hopewell Junction.
St. Francis of Assisi Cemetery (Mount Kisco) - Belongs to St. Francis of Assisi Church in Mount Kisco.
St. Joachim Cemetery (Beacon) - Belongs to St. Joachim-St. John the Evangelist Church in Beacon. The cemetery consists of an old section and a new section.
St. John Cemetery (Goshen) - Belongs to St. John the Evangelist Church in Goshen.
St. John Cemetery (Pawling) - Belongs to St. John the Evangelist Church in Pawling.
St. Joseph Cemetery (Florida) - Belongs to St. Joseph Church in Florida.
St. Joseph Cemetery (Middletown) - Belongs to St. Joseph Church in Middletown.
St. Joseph Cemetery (Millbrook) - Belongs to St. Joseph Church in Millbrook.
St. Joseph Cemetery (Wurtsboro) - Belongs to St. Joseph Church in Wurtsboro.
St. Joseph Cemetery (Yonkers) - Belongs to St. Joseph Church in Yonkers.
St. Lucy Cemetery (Cochecton) - Belongs to St. Francis Xavier Church in Narrowsburg. There was formerly a mission church in Cochecton.
St. Mary Cemetery (Bangall) - Belongs to Immaculate Conception Church in Bangall.
St. Mary Cemetery (Port Jervis) - Belongs to St. Mary Church in Port Jervis.
St. Mary Cemetery (Wappingers Falls) - Belongs to St. Mary Church in Wappingers Falls.
St. Mary Cemetery (Washingtonville) - Belongs to St. Mary Church in Washingtonville.
St. Mary Cemetery (Yonkers) - Belongs to St. Mary Church in Yonkers.
St. Patrick Cemetery (Millerton) - Belongs to Immaculate Conception Church in Amenia. The parish has a mission chapel in Millerton.
St. Patrick Cemetery (Newburgh) - Belongs to St. Patrick Church in Newburgh.
St. Peter Cemetery (Kingston) - Belongs to St. Peter Church in Kingston.
St. Peter Cemetery (Poughkeepsie) - Belongs to St. Peter Church in Hyde Park. The church was formerly located in Poughkeepsie.
St. Raymond Cemetery (The Bronx) - Belongs to St. Raymond Church in the Bronx. The cemetery consists of an old section and a new section.
St. Stephen Cemetery (Warwick) - Belongs to St. Stephen-St. Edward Church in Warwick.
St. Sylvia Cemetery (Tivoli) - Belongs to St. Sylvia Church in Tivoli.
St. Thomas Cemetery (Cornwall-on-Hudson) - Belongs to St. Thomas of Canterbury Church in Cornwall-on-Hudson.

Catholic charitable organizations

Saints, blesseds, venerables, servants of God
Elizabeth Ann Seton – founder of American branch of Sisters of Charity; first canonized saint from New York; first native-born U.S. citizen canonized a saint
Frances Xavier Cabrini – founder of Missionary Sisters of the Sacred Heart of Jesus; first U.S. citizen canonized a saint
Isaac Jogues – Jesuit missionary, active in northern New York State before establishment of Diocese of New York
John Nepomucene Neumann – New York diocesan priest, later a Redemptorist; fourth Bishop of Philadelphia; first U.S. bishop canonized; founder of first Catholic diocesan school system in the U.S.
Kateri Tekakwitha – first Native American (U.S.) canonized a saint
Fulton Sheen – archbishop; prominent radio and television preacher
Pierre Toussaint – Haitian slave; New York businessman and philanthropist
Isaac Hecker – Redemptorist priest; founder of Paulist Fathers
Vincent Capodanno – Maryknoll missionary; U.S. Navy chaplain; Vietnam War hero; Medal of Honor recipient
Dorothy Day – social activist and radical; co-founder of Catholic Worker movement and newspaper
Terence Cooke – archbishop and cardinal; founder of many charitable programs
Rose Hawthorne Lathrop – founder of Dominican Sisters of Hawthorne, as Mother Mary Alphonsa

Major shrines

St. Frances Xavier Cabrini Shrine, at 701 Fort Washington Avenue in Hudson Heights, Manhattan, with a facade on Cabrini Boulevard, next to the former Mother Cabrini High School.
Shrine of St. Elizabeth Ann Bayley Seton, in the Church of Our Lady of the Rosary, at 7 State Street in the Financial District, Manhattan.
National Shrine of Our Lady of Mount Carmel, at 70 Carmelite Drive in Middletown, Orange County, New York.
Salesian National Shrine of Mary Help of Christians, 174 Filors Lane, Stony Point, New York.

Reports of sex abuse
In August 2018, the archdiocese reported that between 2016 and 2018, its Independent Reconciliation and Compensation Program paid nearly $60 million to 278 victims of sex abuse by clergy. On September 26, 2018, it was reported that the Archdiocese of New York, and the three other dioceses where Theodore McCarrick served as a bishop, were facing an investigation by the United States Conference of Catholic Bishops for McCarrick's alleged sex abuse. On January 28, 2019, the New York state Assembly and Senate passed a law allowing prosecutors to bring criminal charges until a victim turned 28, and permitting victims to sue until age 55. New York Governor Andrew Cuomo signed the bill into law on February 14, 2019.

On April 26, 2019, the Archdiocese released a list of 120 Catholic clergy accused of committing acts of sexual abuse. Some of those on the list, which includes both male and female church workers, have been convicted and many are deceased. The list was accompanied by a letter of apology from Cardinal Dolan, who asked for forgiveness.

On August 14, 2019, James Grien, who has accused McCarrick of sexually abusing him when McCarrick was an auxiliary bishop of New York (1977-1981), filed a lawsuit against the Archdiocese of New York. In his lawsuit, Grien also stated that McCarrick's status as a friend of his family allowed the former New York Auxiliary Bishop to continue to visit and sexually abuse him after being transferred to New Jersey's Diocese of Metuchen in 1981 and later the Archdiocese of Newark in 1986.

On September 30, 2019, Dolan released a report written by Barbara S. Jones, a former judge and prosecutor. Her report stated, among other things, that the Archdiocese had completed the process of removing all of its remaining accused clergy from active ministry. In the same report, Jones recommended that the Archdiocese should also hire a sex abuse "czar" to vet all complaints. Jones, who was commissioned by Dolan in 2018 to conduct the review of the church's handling of abuse allegations, also recommended hiring "a compliance officer for the Office of Priest Personnel to monitor its functions and oversee the new document management system". Dolan also backed the Jones Report and stated at a press conference that the archdiocese was expanding its sex abuse policy as well.

On October 10, 2019, it was announced that Pope Francis had accepted the resignation of Bronx-based Auxiliary Bishop John Jenik following an accusation of sex abuse. Appointed Auxiliary Bishop by Pope Francis in 2014, Jenik also served as vicar for the Northwest Bronx, appointed by Dolan's predecessor Edward Egan in 2006. Jenik, who submitted his resignation letter upon turning 75 in March 2019, had stepped out of public ministry in October 2018 after the allegation surfaced.

On May 8, 2020, Cuomo extended the 2019 New York Child Victim Act's statewide statute of limitations deadline to file sex abuse lawsuits, which was originally set for August 14, 2020, to January 14, 2021.

On July 27, 2020, it was revealed that a Catholic priest who served the Archdiocese of New York in upstate New York's Orange County was named in a new sex abuse lawsuit. In the lawsuit, eight men alleged that longtime Orange County priest George Boxelaar, who died in 1990, sexually abused them when they were children (1970s-80s), adding their claims to those of at least three other accusers of the late Boxelaar who have sued. These three other accusers had filed lawsuits through the state Supreme Court in Orange County in late 2019, with one also naming the Archdiocese of New York and two churches - Holy Cross in Wawaynda and Our Lady of Mount Carmel in Middletown - as defendants. In addition to these new lawsuits, a Scarsdale Catholic school teacher identified as Edwin Gaylor also confessed to committing acts of sex abuse.

On December 3, 2020, New York City priest Fr. George Rutler, the prestigious pastor of the Church of St. Michael in Manhattan was accused by a female security guard, who worked at Rutler's parish for two shifts, of watching pornography and "aggressively" groping her. Rutler, considered a popular conservative priest, has made numerous appearances on EWTN and has written 30 books. Following the accusations, he maintained his innocence but offered to temporarily step down as pastor during the subsequent investigation. In May 2021, the District Attorney of Manhattan declined to bring charges, dismissing the accusations and allegedly calling them "baseless."

Province of New York

See also

:Category:People of Roman Catholic Archdiocese of New York
John P. Chidwick – New York diocesan priest; chaplain on USS Maine
Sisters of Life – founded in 1991 by John Joseph O'Connor, Cardinal Archbishop of New York

References

External links

Roman Catholic Archdiocese of New York (official site)
 (ny-archdiocese.org)
Catholic New York
Catholic Encyclopedia article
New York State Catholic Conference

 
1808 establishments in New York (state)
Religious organizations established in 1808
New York